Senator Holloway may refer to:

John Chandler Holloway (1826–1901), Wisconsin State Senate
Vernon Holloway (1919–2000), Florida State Senate
William J. Holloway (1888–1970), Oklahoma State Senate